is a song by Chara, released under the name Yen Town Band. It was the lead single from Montage, a concept album released for the Shunji Iwai film Swallowtail Butterfly that also starred Chara. This song was used as the theme song for the film.

The single debuted at #31 on Oricon's singles charts. Two months later, after the release of the film and album, the single managed to reach #1.

The song was written by Takeshi Kobayashi, in collaboration with Chara and film director Shunji Iwai.

Music video

The music video begins with a long panning shot over a cityscape. It then shows Chara against a farm windmill. It then switches to a junkyard, where Chara and several other people are filtering through rubbish. They eventually find a working piano, which they bring back on the back of a pickup truck. Chara plays the piano as the car drives off. This scene is interspersed with scenes from the movie.

Track listing

Chart rankings

Sales

Cover versions
Cinnabom (2007, compilation album Sound of Kula)
Hiromi Hirata (as Makoto Kikuchi) (2007, album The Idolmaster Master Artist 04)
Yoshihiko Kai (2007, album 10 Stories)
Kumi Koda (2010, album Eternity: Love & Songs)
Scott Murphy (from Allister) (2008, album Guilty Pleasures II)
Moumoon (2010, EP Spark)
My Little Lover (2001, album Singles). Released as a self-cover (Takeshi Kobayashi was, at the time, a member of My Little Lover.) A music video was released.
Ayano Tsuji (2004, album Cover Girl)
 Nagi Yanagi (2013, album Euaru)
 Kana Hanazawa (2019, anime Afterlost)

References

Chara (singer) songs
1996 singles
Songs written for films
Pop ballads
Oricon Weekly number-one singles
Japanese-language songs
Songs written by Chara (singer)
1996 songs
Japanese film songs
Songs written by Takeshi Kobayashi
Song recordings produced by Takeshi Kobayashi